Denglong Township is a township under the administration of Baiyü County, Garzê Tibetan Autonomous Prefecture, Sichuan, China. , it administers the following six villages:
Wusa Village
Dongtuo Village
Dingge Village
Kangtong Village
Gongba Village
Nuozong Village

See also 
 List of township-level divisions of Sichuan

References

Township-level divisions of Sichuan
Baiyü County